Lucia Lin is a Taiwanese academic administrator and politician. She was the Political Deputy Minister of Education from August 2014 until May 2016.

Education
Lin obtained her bachelor's and master's degrees from National Taiwan University in 1986 and 1989, respectively. She obtained another master's degree in education from Harvard University in the United States (US) in 1990. And finally she obtained her doctoral degree in instructional systems from Florida State University in the US in 1992.

Early career
Lin has held several positions in Fu Jen Catholic University, such as chair of the Graduate Institute of Education Leadership and Development from 2000 to 2005, vice president of Administrative Affairs from 2006 to 2008, dean of the College of Education in 2011 and vice president of Academic Affairs from 2008 to 2012. She was the president of Wenzao Ursuline University of Languages from 2013 to 2014.

References

Living people
Taiwanese Ministers of Education
Harvard Graduate School of Education alumni
National Taiwan University alumni
Florida State University alumni
Year of birth missing (living people)